The Order of New Brunswick is a civilian honour for merit in the Canadian province of New Brunswick. Instituted in 2000 by Lieutenant Governor Marilyn Trenholme Counsell, on the advice of the Cabinet under Premier Bernard Lord, the order is administered by the Governor-in-Council and is intended to honour current or former New Brunswick residents for conspicuous achievements in any field, being thus described as the highest honour amongst all others conferred by the New Brunswick Crown.

Structure and appointment
The Order of New Brunswick is intended to honour any current or former longtime resident of New Brunswick who has demonstrated a high level of individual excellence and achievement in any field, having made "outstanding contributions to the social, cultural or economic well-being of New Brunswick and its residents." There are no limits on how many can belong to the order, though inductions are limited to 10 per year; Canadian citizenship is a requirement, and those who are elected or appointed members of a governmental body are ineligible as long as they hold office.

The process of finding qualified individuals begins with submissions from the public to the Order of New Brunswick Advisory Council, which consists of the Chief Justice of New Brunswick; the Clerk of the Executive Council; the president of a Crown-funded university in the province, each serving on a rotating basis; and between three and five Members of the Order of New Brunswick, one of whom serves as the chairperson of the council. This committee then meets at least once annually to make its selected recommendations to the lieutenant governor; posthumous nominations are not accepted, though an individual who dies after his or her name was submitted to the Advisory Council can still be retroactively made a Member of the Order of New Brunswick. The lieutenant governor, ex officio a Member and the Chancellor of the Order of New Brunswick, then makes all appointments into the fellowship's single grade of membership by an Order in Council that bears the viceroyal sign-manual and the Great Seal of the province; thereafter, the new Members are entitled to use the post-nominal letters ONB.

Insignia
Upon admission into the Order of New Brunswick, usually in a ceremony held at Government House in Fredericton, new Members are presented with the order's insignia. The main badge consists of a gold medallion in the form of a stylized viola cucullata (or purple violet)—the official provincial flower—with the obverse in violet enamel with gold edging, and bearing at its centre the escutcheon of the arms of New Brunswick, all surmounted by a St. Edward's Crown symbolizing the Canadian monarch's role as the fount of honour. The ribbon is patterned with vertical stripes in blue, red, and gold; men wear the medallion suspended from this ribbon at the collar, while women carry theirs on a ribbon bow at the left chest. Members also receive a lapel pin that can be worn during less formal occasions.

Inductees
The following are some notable appointees of the Order of New Brunswick:

 Max Aitken, Lord Beaverbrook PC, businessman, politician in United Kingdom, benefactor, posthumously appointed 2011
 Molly Lamb Bobak , printmaker and painter, appointed 2002
 Herménégilde Chiasson , Lieutenant Governor of New Brunswick, appointed 2005
 Fred Cogswell , poet, posthumously appointed 2004
 Marilyn Trenholme Counsell , Lieutenant Governor of New Brunswick, appointed 2000
 Calixte Duguay , singer/songwriter, appointed 2012
 Gordon Fairweather , lawyer and politician, appointed 2005
 Raymond Fraser , author, appointed 2012
 Richard Bennett Hatfield , Premier of New Brunswick, posthumously appointed 2002
 Arthur Irving , industrialist, appointed 2012
 James K. Irving , businessman and conservationist, appointed 2008
 Kenneth Colin Irving , businessman and industrialist, posthumously appointed 2003
 Roméo-Adrien LeBlanc , Governor General of Canada, appointed 2005
 Viola Léger , actress and Senator, appointed 2007
 Bernard Lord , Premier of New Brunswick, appointed 2007
 Antonine Maillet , novelist and playwright, appointed 2005
 G. Wallace F. McCain , businessman, appointed 2003
 Harrison McCain , businessman, appointed 2002
 Francis Joseph McKenna , Premier of New Brunswick and Ambassador to the United States, appointed 2004
 Willie O'Ree , professional hockey player, appointed 2005
 David Adams Richards , novelist, essayist, and screenwriter, appointed 2005
 Brenda Mary Robertson , politician and Senator, appointed 2004
 Louis Joseph Robichaud , Premier of New Brunswick, appointed 2002
 Ron Turcotte , jockey, appointed 2012

See also
 Canadian order of precedence (decorations and medals)
 Symbols of New Brunswick
 State decoration

References

External links
 

Provincial and territorial orders of Canada

New Brunswick awards